Plain-backed thrush is a common name for a broad species concept of Zoothera mollissima. The bird has been split into the following species:

Alpine thrush, Zoothera mollissima
Sichuan thrush, Zoothera griseiceps
Himalayan thrush, Zoothera salimalii

Birds by common name